The Japan Revolutionary Communist League (Revolutionary Marxist Faction) is a Japanese Trotskyist revolutionary group, often referred to by the abbreviation Kakumaru-ha in Japanese. It is classified as a Far Left organization.

History

The group's origins lie in its split from the Japanese Communist Party following the Hungarian Revolution of 1956.  The dissenting factions attended a congress of the Japanese New Left in 1957 and agreed to unite as the Japan Revolutionary Communist League (RCL), usually abbreviated as Kakukyōdō in Japanese. This group was fervently anti-Stalinist, and soon fell under the sway of the charismatic half-blind Trotskyist philosopher Kan'ichi Kuroda. Their goals at this time were to overthrow the Japanese government, end U.S. occupation of Okinawa, and abolish the U.S.-Japan Alliance.

Kakumaru-ha evolved into its current form after a series of schisms. In 1959, Kuroda Kan'ichi was expelled from the RCL in the wake of a scandal in which he tried to sell compromising information about the JCP to the Tokyo Metropolitan Police Department (MPD). Therefore, Kuroda, along with his right-hand man Nobuyoshi Honda, founded their own version of the RCL, with the appellation "National Committee" added to the name, and took many of their followers with them to create the RCL-NC. In 1960, a youth branch of the RCL-NC was established for Zengakuren student activists as the Marxist Student League (MSL), abbreviated Marugakudō in Japanese.

Finally in 1963, the parent organization RCL-NC split in two as the result of a disagreement between Kuroda and Honda over whether to pursue socialist revolution in alliance with others, or to focus on strengthening and expanding a single revolutionary organization, with the resultant split of Marugakudō into the "Central Core Faction" (Chūkaku-ha), which was led by Honda and favored allying with others, and the "Revolutionary Marxist Faction" (abbreviated Kakumaru-ha), which staunchly adhered to Kuroda's insistence on going it alone.

The two groups had frequent violent conflicts and, by the mid-1970s, these were resulting in several deaths per year—16 in 1975 alone, including Kakumaru-ha's assassination of Chūkaku-ha's leader Honda Nobuyasu. The organisation subsequently engaged in a number of high-profile guerrilla activities while continuing to organise on university campuses, primarily through their Zengakuren faction. In 1998, police seized thousands of recordings of their conversations made by Faction members, which a spokesperson claimed had been "necessary to protect the organisation."

Formerly close to the Spartacist League, the group now has friendly relations with the International Trotskyist Fraction.

References

External links
Official website (English)

Communist militant groups
Communist parties in Japan
Far-left politics in Japan
Left-wing militant groups in Japan
Political parties established in 1963
Trotskyist organizations in Asia